CSCBank SAL (also known as CSC Group or “CSC”), is a Lebanese bank headquartered in Lebanon with offices in Jordan and Cyprus, along with processing centers located in the two countries.  CSC has a branch network and operations in 30 countries in the Middle East, Africa and Europe. Moreover, CSC has a Disaster Recovery (DR) site in Cyprus.

Regulated by the Central Bank of Lebanon (Banque du Liban), the Banking Control Commission in addition to the Special Investigation Commission, CSC provides services such as Card Issuing & Management, ATM & Merchant Acquiring, POS Driving & Switching as well as Mobile Payment & Consultancy. Additionally, CSC is licensed to issue and acquire the following worldwide trademarks:
 MasterCard
 Visa
 UnionPay
 American Express
 Diners Club International
 GCC Net
 JCB
 Pulse
 Discover

References

Banks of Lebanon
1992 establishments in Lebanon
Companies based in Beirut